Prince Chun of the First Rank, or simply Prince Chun, was the title of a princely peerage used in China during the Manchu-led Qing dynasty (1644–1912). As the Prince Chun peerage was not awarded "iron-cap" status, this meant that each successive bearer of the title would normally start off with a title downgraded by one rank vis-à-vis that held by his predecessor. However, the title would generally not be downgraded to any lower than a feng'en fuguo gong except under special circumstances.

The first bearer of the title was Yunyou (允祐; 1680–1730), the Kangxi Emperor's seventh son. In 1709, Yunyou was granted the title "Prince Chun of the Second Rank" by his father. He was promoted to "Prince Chun of the First Rank" in 1723 during the reign of his fourth brother, the Yongzheng Emperor. The title was passed down over seven generations and held by seven persons.

Members of the Prince Chun peerage

 Yunyou (允祐; 1680 – 1730; 1st), 's seventh son of Kangxi Emperor, initially a beile, promoted to Prince Chun of the Second Rank in 1709 and then to Prince Chun of the First Rank in 1723, posthumously honoured as Prince Chundu of the First Rank (淳度親王)
1 Hongshu (弘曙; 1698 – 1738), designated as Yunyou's hereditary prince from 1723 to 1727, his title stripped in 1727
three surviving sons: Yong'an (永安), Yongdun (永敦) and Yongsheng (永盛)
2 Hongzhuo (弘晫; 1700 – 1743), held the title of a bulwark general in 1743
2 Yonghong (永玒), held the title of a supporter general from 1744 to 1752
3 Yongzhuang (永莊), held the title of a grace general from 1753 to 1777
6 Hongjing (弘暻; 1711 – 1777; 2nd), designated as Yunyou's hereditary prince from 1727 to 1730, held the title Prince Chun of the Second Rank from 1730 to 1777, posthumously honoured as Prince Chunshen of the Second Rank (淳慎郡王)
other sons: Yongfan (永璠), Yongxie (永協), Yongqia (永恰), Yongzhuo (永卓) and Yongguang (永廣)
8 Yongyun (永鋆; 1771 – 1820; 3rd), held the title of a beile from 1778 to 1820. His primary consort was one of Heshen's daughter.
1 Miansuan (綿算)
2 Mianqing (綿清; 1791 – 1851; 4th), held the title of a first class bulwark general from 1812 to 1821, promoted to beizi in 1821
three sons: Yilin (奕麟), Yimao (奕茂) and Yishu (奕孰)
4 Yiliang (奕樑; 1819 – 1887; 5th), held the title of a third class defender general from 1838 to 1851, promoted to grace defender duke in 1851, made an acting beizi in 1872
eldest and 2nd son: Zaizhao (載炤) and Zaiguang (載灮)
3 Zaikui (載㷇; 1862 – 1894; 6th), held the title of a grace defender duke from 1887 to 1894
1 Pukun (溥堃; 1885 – 1932; 7th), held the title of a grace defender duke from 1895 to 1932
(a) Yuying (毓蓥), Pukun's adopted son
4th to 6th son: Zaixiu (載烋), Zaixi (載熹) and Zaizheng (載烝), all of them were third class imperial body guards
5 Yiquan (奕權), held the title of a second class bulwark general from 1844 to 1864, had no male heir
6 Yirong (奕榕), held the title of a grace general from 1844 to 1875, stripped of his title in 1875
7th to 11th son: Yimo (奕模), Yichun (奕純), Yixiao (奕效), Yisu (奕肅) and Yibo (奕博)
12 Yifeng (奕楓), held the title of a grace general from 1851 to 1881
3 Zaiwei (載煒), held the title of a grace general from 1881
3 Miansan (綿𣿯), held the title of a first class bulwark general from 1826 to 1871, had no male heir
4 Mianxie (綿爕), a vice commander-in-chief
5 Mianxun (綿洵), held the title of a grace general from 1826 to 1858
1 Yijian (奕檻), held the title of a grace general from 1859 to 1886
1 Zaiyu (載煜), held the title of a grace general from 1887
6 Mianjing (綿瀞)
7 Mianshu (綿淑), held the title of a grace general from 1826 to 1847
1 Yihua (奕樺), held the title of a grace general from 1847 to 1862, his title stripped in 1862
other younger sons: Miantian (綿田), Mianying (綿英) and Miangui (綿貴)
7 Hongtai (弘泰; 1720 – 1757), held the title of a third class supporter general from 1743 to 1757

Family tree
 - Title bearers
 - Emperors

See also
 Royal and noble ranks of the Qing dynasty

References
 

Qing dynasty princely peerages
Peerages of the Bordered White Banner